Marcel Bozzuffi (28 October 19291 February 1988) was a French film actor.  He appeared as a hitman in the Oscar-winning American film The French Connection. In 1963, he married French actress Françoise Fabian.

Selected filmography

1955: Caroline and the Rebels as Un Soldat (uncredited)
1955: Razzia sur la chnouf as Le Client au Révolver (uncredited)
1955: Chantage as Un Accusé
1955: Gas-Oil as Pierrot Ragondin
1955: La Meilleure Part
1956: La Bande à papa as La Volaille
1956: The Wages of Sin
1956: Le Pays d'où je viens as Le chauffeur du camion
1957: Reproduction interdite as Bernard
1957: Le rouge est mis as Pierre 
1957: Escapade as Raymond
1958: Le Sicilien as Pete
1959: Asphalte as Gino
1960: Le Caïd as Toni 
1961: Le Sahara brûle as Gomez
1961: Tintin and the Golden Fleece (Tintin et le Mystère de la Toison d'or) as Angorapoulos
1963: The Day and the Hour (Le jour et l'heure) as Inspector Lerat
1963: Maigret Sees Red as Torrence 
1965: Heaven on One's Head (Le Ciel sur la tête) as Captain
1965: The Sleeping Car Murders (Compartiment tueurs) as Un Agent de Police (uncredited)
1966: The Upper Hand as Marque Mal
1966: Le deuxième souffle as Jo Ricci 
1968: Béru et ces dames as Francis
1969: Life Love Death (La Vie, l'Amour, la Mort) as Le Commissaire Marchand
1969: Z as Vago
1969: L'Américain as Jacky
1969: Love Is a Funny Thing (Un homme qui me plaît) as Le mari de Françoise
1970:  as Marco / Sidekick
1970: Vertige pour un tueur as Marc
1970: The Lady in the Car with Glasses and a Gun as Manuel
1970: Crepa padrone, crepa tranquillo1971: Comptes à rebours as Zampa
1971: The French Connection as Pierre "Frog Two" Nicoli
1971: Daisy Town as Lucky Luke (voice)
1972: Images as Rene
1972: Trois milliards sans ascenseur as Gus
1972: Black Turin (Torino nera) as Fridda
1973: Le Fils as Marcel / Gunman
1973: Les Hommes as Félix Vinciguerra 'Vinci'
1973: Chino (The Valdez Horses) as Maral
1974: Hold-Up, instantánea de una corrupción as Steve Duggins
1974: Caravan to Vaccarès as Czerda
1974: The Marseille Contract as Calmet 
1974: Drama of the Rich (Fatti di gente perbene) as Augusto Stanzani
1975: Go Gorilla Go1975:  as Policeman Blot
1975: Hallucination Strip (Roma drogata: la polizia non può intervenire) as Il Commissario De Stefani
1976: Illustrious Corpses (Cadaveri eccellenti) as The Lazy
1976: Colt 38 Special Squad (Quelli della calibro 38) as Inspector Vanni
1976: Rome: The Other Side of Violence as Carli
1977: Le Juge Fayard dit Le Shériff as Joanno dit Le Capitaine
1977: Stunt Squad (La polizia è sconfitta) as Grifi
1977: March or Die as Lieutenant Fontaine
1977: L'uomo di Corleone1978: Safari Rally (6000 km di paura) as Paul Stark
1979: The Passage as Perea
1979: Bloodline as Man In Black
1979: Il cappotto di Astrakan as Commissario Juvet
1980: Contraband (Luca il contrabbandiere) as Francois Jacois, The Marsigliese
1980: La Cage aux Folles II as Broca
1982: Identification of a Woman (Identificazione di una donna) as Mario
1983: Le Cercle des passions as Turiddu Zangara
1983: Afghanistan pourquoi? as Colonel Russe
1984: To Catch a King as Colonel da Cunha
1984: Asphalt Warriors (L'Arbalète) as Falco
1986: Adiós pequeña as Fidel Arteche
1986: L'ogre as Paul Calmet
1988: Savannah as Caplan
1988: Giallo alla regola'' as Colonel Catalini

External links
 

1929 births
1988 deaths
Actors from Rennes
French male film actors
French male television actors
French male stage actors
French male voice actors
Burials at Montparnasse Cemetery
20th-century French male actors
French people of Italian descent